Elżbieta Wójcik (born 14 January 1996) is a Polish boxer. She competed in the women's middleweight event at the 2020 Summer Olympics.

References

External links
 

1996 births
Living people
Polish women boxers
Olympic boxers of Poland
Boxers at the 2020 Summer Olympics
Place of birth missing (living people)
Boxers at the 2014 Summer Youth Olympics
Youth Olympic gold medalists for Poland
Boxers at the 2019 European Games
European Games bronze medalists for Poland
European Games medalists in boxing
21st-century Polish women
20th-century Polish women